The Aerial Delivery Research and Development Establishment (ADRDE) is a laboratory of the Indian Defence Research and Development Organisation (DRDO). It is located in Agra, Uttar Pradesh in India. Its research scope includes development of systems for dropping heavy loads, brake parachutes, towed targets, aircraft arrester barriers and aerostats.

Projects 
Significant projects undertaken by ADRDE during the last two decades include: 

 Armament delivery parachutes
 Space recovery parachutes
 Balloon barrage and surveillance systems
 Airships and related applications. 

The projects enter the production at Ordnance Parachute Factory, Kanpur.
ADRDE was involved in the design and development of a recovery parachute for the Nishant Unmanned Aerial Vehicle. The organisation developed brake parachutes for LCA Tejas and parachutes for the space capsule of Re-entry experiment SRE-1 by ISRO . Akashdeep, a 2000 cu. m aerostat, was successfully test-flown with actual and dummy payloads. 

ADRDE developed the Controlled Aerial Delivery System to deliver payloads through ram-air parachutes at designated coordinates via an on-board electronics unit. This accomplishment is considered one of the unit's major achievements.

References

External links
 DIRECTORATE OF AERONAUTICS

Defence Research and Development Organisation laboratories
Research institutes in Uttar Pradesh
Research and development in India
Year of establishment missing